Serbian League West is one of four sections of the Serbian League, the third national tier. The other three sections are Serbian League Belgrade, Serbian League East and Serbian League Vojvodina. It is also the highest regional league for the western part of Serbia.

The league was founded in 2003 following a merger between the Serbian League Dunav and the Serbian League Morava.

Seasons

Members for 2022–23 

The following 16 clubs compete in the Serbian League West during the 2022–23 season.

References

External links
 Football Association of Serbia
 Football Association of West Serbia

   
West